Mother River may refer to:

Rivers and waterways
Danube, Central and Eastern Europe
Emajõgi, Estonia
Fen River, Shanxi Province, China
Mavil Aru, Sri Lanka
Meishe River, Hainan, China
Horikawa River, Japan
Mother Brook, Boston, Massachusetts, United States
Red River (Asia), Yunnan in Southwest China through northern Vietnam
Sarasvati River, mentioned in Rig Veda and Vedic texts
Ting River, China
Yangtze River, China
Yellow River, China
Yitong River, China